Eliteserien is a Norwegian professional league for association football clubs. At the top of the Norwegian football league system, it is the country's primary football competition. Contested by 16 clubs, it operates on a system of promotion and relegation with the Norwegian First Division.

Seasons run from March to November with each team playing 30 matches (playing each other home and away). Most games are played on Sunday evenings.

Eliteserien was founded in 1937 as Norgesserien, and the first season was the 1937–38 season. The structure and name of Eliteserien, along with Norway's other football leagues, has undergone frequent changes. The top level was renamed Hovedserien in 1948, 1. divisjon (now used by the second level league in Norway) in 1963, then Tippeligaen (named for the main sponsor) in 1990. Starting with the 2017 season the league adopted the current Eliteserien, after NFF decided to totally drop any sponsor's names from the name of the league. The broadcasting rights were in December 2015 secured by Discovery Networks who signed a six-year deal giving them rights to broadcast all the 240 games in Eliteserien from 2017 to 2023. The deal was worth NOK 2.4 billion. The league generates NOK 400 million per year in domestic television rights. The Norwegian top flight has been professional since 1992. In 1995, Tippeligaen was expanded to 14 teams, and in 2009 it was further expanded to 16 teams.

Seventeen clubs have won the title since the inception of the league in 1937: Rosenborg (26), Fredrikstad (9), Viking (8), Lillestrøm (5), Molde (5), Vålerenga (5), Brann (3), Larvik Turn (3), Bodø/Glimt (2), Lyn (2), Start (2), Strømsgodset (2), Fram Larvik (1), Freidig (1), Moss (1), Skeid (1) and Stabæk (1). In 2010, Rosenborg became, and still remain, the only club to complete an Eliteserien campaign without losing a single game. The record of most points in a season is 81 by Bodø/Glimt in 2020. Since its establishment as a one-group top flight in 1963, forty-eight clubs have competed in Eliteserien.

History

Early years (1937–1948)
Before 1937, there was no national league competition in Norway; only regional leagues and the Norwegian Cup. Starting in 1937–38, the various regional leagues in Southern Norway were aligned into eight districts, with a championship playoff between the winners to crown a national champion. This competition was called Norgesserien (English: The League of Norway). In the early years, the top flight teams were divided into eleven groups from eight districts. The league champion was decided in either a knockout tournament or a final between the winners of these groups. Fredrikstad was the first champions of the league, winning the 1937–38 season. They won the two-legged final against Lyn 4–0 on aggregate. Fredrikstad defended their title in the 1938–39 season. From the 1937–38 season and until the beginning of World War II, the teams were divided into eight district groups. There were plans at the time to merge the district leagues into a national competition, but because of World War II, this process was delayed until after the war, although also the first post-war season in 1947–48 had eleven district-based groups.

Hovedserien (1948–1962)
In 1948, Hovedserien (English: The Main League) was created, consisting of the 16 top teams from the district leagues, who were placed into two groups of eight, with the group winners playing a two-legged final for the national championship at the end of the season. This format was in place from the 1948–49 season until 1960–61, when it was decided to merge the two groups into a single top division, and have the season follow the calendar year from 1963 onwards. The 1950s were dominated by Fredrikstad FK and Larvik Turn. Fredrikstad won their latest league title in 1960–61, which secured their ninth title out of sixteen possible. Larvik Turn won Hovedserien three times in four seasons from 1955–56. The 1961–62 season was played during 15 months. The teams from the two groups in the 1960–61 top division were put in one group consisting of 16 teams. The 1961–62 season became a transitional season, where the 16 top-flight teams were placed in a single group, playing a season that went on for 15 months and one half of its teams were relegated. Officially still known as Hovedserien, the 1961–62 season is often referred to as Maratonserien ("The Marathon League") due to its unusual length. The Maratonserien was won by Brann.

1. divisjon (1963–1989)
In 1963, a single top division containing ten teams was introduced, and the league was renamed 1. divisjon (English: 1st Division). The first regular one-league season was played spring-autumn and was won by title defenders Brann in 1963. The league was expanded to 12 teams in 1972. Teams from Northern Norway were not allowed to gain promotion to the top division before 1972, when Mjølner became the first team from Northern Norway to play in the top flight, and  until 1979 were subject to stricter promotion rules than teams from the rest of the country. Viking won the league four consecutive seasons beginning in 1972. Lillestrøm won back-to-back titles in 1976 and 1977. In 1979 teams from Northern Norway were given the same promotion rights as the rest of the country. In the beginning of the 1980s, Vålerengen were the dominant team, with their titles from 1981, 1983 and 1984.

Tippeligaen (1990–2016)

In 1990, the league was renamed Tippeligaen, when Norsk Tipping became the main sponsor of the league. When fans and media continued referring to the league as 1. divisjon, it was decided to let the second level league of Norwegian football "inherit" the name 1. divisjon in 1991, to help Tippeligaen establish as a brand. Rosenborg of Trondheim won the first year the league bore the name Tippeligaen in 1990. Followed by a win by Viking of Stavanger in 1991. In 1992, Rosenborg started a run of 13 consecutive titles which lasted to the 2004 season. During the first years of Rosenborg's thirteen-year run, they won the league with substantial margins, only partly challenged by Bodø/Glimt, Molde, Lillestrøm and Brann. However, this was steadily narrowing down towards a dramatic finish in 2004, where the Trondheim team tied with Vålerenga of Oslo in game points and on goal difference, but finished ahead on number of goals scored. However, in 2005 the winning streak came to an end as Vålerenga clinched the title, one point ahead of Start of Kristiansand. Rosenborg was never in contention that season and would finish only 7th. In 2006, Rosenborg returned to the top of the league, coming back from 10 points behind Brann at the halfway point to clinch the title with a match to spare. Brann won the league in 2007, and Stabæk won their first-ever title in 2008. Rosenborg then returned for a two-year winning streak in 2009 and 2010. Molde's back-to-back titles in 2011 and 2012 makes it the only other club to win consecutive titles in the current format, and outside Rosenborg, the first team to do so since Vålerenga in 1983 and 1984.

Recent years (2017–present)
In 2016 it was decided to change from the sponsorship name Tippeligaen to the non-sponsorship name Eliteserien, effecting from the 2017 season. Rosenborg won the league four consecutive times from 2015 to 2018, before Molde ended their streak by winning the title in the 2019 season. Lillestrøm were relegated from the 2019 Eliteserien and ended their record spell with 45 consecutive top division seasons. Bodø/Glimt became the first team from Northern Norway to win the league by winning the title in the 2020 season with 81 points, an all-time record.

Competition format

Competition
As of the 2022 season there are 16 clubs in the Eliteserien, seven of which are located in Eastern Norway, five are from Western Norway, two north of the Arctic Circle and one each are from Southern Norway and Trøndelag.

During the course of a season, each club plays the others twice, home and away, for a total of 30 games for each club, and a total of 240 games in a season. The season starts in March and lasts until early November. Rounds played during the weekends are usually broken up into two games on Saturdays, five games on Sundays and one game on either Fridays or Mondays. For the final two rounds, all games start simultaneously so that no club may gain an unfair advantage by knowing the results of other games in advance of kicking off their own.

The 16 May round, which is played the day before Norway's Constitution Day, 17 May, is one of the most anticipated rounds of the season. It is often referred to as the "national day of football" and since it precedes a national holiday, games usually see higher attendance than other rounds.

Teams receive three points for a win and one point for a draw. No points are awarded for a loss. Teams are ranked by total points, then goal difference, goals scored, and then head-to-head records used to separate teams on equal points. At the end of each season, the club with the most points is crowned "League Winner". The title of "Norwegian Champions" is reserved for the winners of the Norwegian Football Cup. The two lowest placed teams are automatically relegated to the Norwegian First Division and the top two teams from the First Division take their place. The fourteenth placed team in Eliteserien is also in danger of being relegated and must enter play-offs against one team from the First Division to stay in the top flight.

Changes in competition format

Eliteserien teams in international competition

Rosenborg (11 times) and Molde (once) are the only Norwegian clubs to participate in the UEFA Champions League group stage. Rosenborg reached the quarterfinal in the 1996–97 season. They were eliminated by runners-up Juventus with 1–3 on aggregate. In the 1968–69 season, Lyn lost the European Cup Winners' Cup quarterfinal against runners-up Barcelona with 4–5 on aggregate. Brann lost the quarterfinal against Liverpool in the 1996–97 UEFA Cup Winners' Cup and Vålerenga lost the quarterfinal against Chelsea in the 1998–99 UEFA Cup Winners' Cup with 2–6 on aggregate. Molde reached the round of 16 in UEFA Cup/UEFA Europa League in the 2020-21 season.

Clubs

Current members

The following sixteen clubs are competing in the Eliteserien during the 2023 season.

Notes

List of champions

Below is a list of the gold, silver and bronze medalists in the Norwegian top flight since its beginning in 1937–38. (The Norwegian Cup has been played since 1902, and is still officially known as the Norwegian Championship, presented with "The King's Cup".) During 1937–1948 the name of the league was Norgesserien ("The League of Norway"), 1948–1962 Hovedserien ("The Main League"), 1963–1989 1. divisjon ("1st Division"), and from 1990 Tippeligaen (sponsored name) or Eliteserien ("The Elite League", a generic name).

From 1937 until 1948, the championship was decided through a playoff between the winners of the various regional leagues in Southern Norway. From 1948 until 1961, the 16-team league was divided into two groups, and decided by a final match between the group winners. Since then it has been a round-robin decided through a league table. Bronze finals were played in 1960 and 1961; before that no bronze medals were awarded. Note that clubs from Northern Norway (including Bodø/Glimt and Tromsø IL), allegedly due to travel distance, were not allowed in the top division until 1972, but a separate Northern Norwegian Cup was played. Furthermore, northern Norwegian teams had stricter promotion rules until 1979. The league did not play during the period 1940–1946 because of the World War II.

See below for a list of medalists by club.

Medalists by year 
The following medals have been awarded:

Note: 1 First season when North Norwegian teams were allowed to play in the top division.

Medalists by club 
 Eliteserien title holders 

The following clubs have won one or more Eliteserien medals since 1937–38:

Honoured clubs
Clubs in European football are commonly honoured for winning multiple league titles and a representative golden star is sometimes placed above the club badge to indicate the club having won 10 league titles. In Norway the star symbolizes 10 Eliteserien titles. Rosenborg was the first team to introduce a star when they won their 10th title in 1995. No club has introduced a star since 2006, when Rosenborg won their 20th league title to put a second star on their badge. The clubs closest to their first are Fredrikstad with 9 Eliteserien titles and Viking with 8 Eliteserien titles. The following table is ordered after number of stars followed by number of Eliteserien titles.

Statistics updated as of the end of the 2019 season

Sponsorship 
From 1990 to 2016, Eliteserien had title sponsorship rights sold to Norsk Tipping.

Eliteserien has a number of official partners and suppliers. The official ball supplier for the league is Select who on 27 October 2017 signed the first ever contract to deliver official balls for Eliteserien. The three-year deal began from the start of the 2018 season.

Broadcasters 
All matches are aired live on Discovery's Eurosport, with four matches per week aired live on TVNorge (Norway only) from 2017 until 2023. From 2020, the coverage is also available for all European countries (excluding the Balkans).

In Balkans, the league is currently aired on Arena Sport.

In the United Kingdom and Ireland  matches are aired live on OneFootball.

All matches are broadcast internationally on Eleven Sports.

Stadiums 

Since the competition format was changed to a one-group top flight in 1963, Eliteserien football has been played in 56 stadiums. As of the start of the 2020 season, Ullevaal Stadion has hosted the most matches in the top flight with 697. Since the opening of Vålerenga's new stadium Intility Arena in August 2017, no clubs in Eliteserien use Ullevaal Stadion as their home ground. Two stadiums that have seen Eliteserien football (1963–) have now been demolished.

The stadiums for the 2022 season show a large disparity in capacity: Lerkendal Stadion, the home of Rosenborg, has a capacity of 21,421 with Levermyr Stadion, the home of Jerv, having a capacity of 3,300. The combined total capacity of Eliteserien in the 2020 season is 170,677 with an average capacity of 10,667.

The Eliteserien's record average attendance was set during the 2007 season. This record attendance recorded an average attendance of 10,521 with a total attendance of just under 2 million. The 2 million mark was crossed after the 2009 league extension to sixteen teams. 2,151,219 was the total attendance in 2009, which is the record total attendance.

Managers 
Managers or head coaches in the Eliteserien are involved in the day-to-day running of the team, including the training, team selection, and player acquisition. Their influence varies from club-to-club and is related to the structure of the club and the relationship of the manager with fans. Managers are required to have a UEFA Pro Licence which is the final coaching qualification available, and follows the completion of the UEFA 'B' and 'A' Licences. The UEFA Pro Licence is required by every person who wishes to manage a club in the Eliteserien on a permanent basis.

In the 2019 season, only one manager or head coach was sacked. On 2 December 2019, Jörgen Lennartsson of Lillestrøm was sacked after the final round of the season after the team finished in 14th place. He was replaced by Tom Nordlie ahead of the relegation play-offs. Bjørn Petter Ingebretsen of Strømsgodset resigned on 15 May due to health problems and Henning Berg of Stabæk was signed by Cypriot club AC Omonia on 6 June. In the 2020 season, only one manager or head coach has left his position; Eirik Horneland left Rosenborg on a mutual consent on 26 June 2020.

Statistics

League ranking and European qualification

In the UEFA coefficient, UEFA's rankings of European leagues based on their performances in European competitions over a five-year period, the league ranked 27th at the end of the 2012–2013 European season, its lowest ranking since 1993. The league's highest ranking, tenth place, came in 1998. The winners of the previous calendar year's Eliteserien enter the second qualifying round of the UEFA Champions League, while the cup winners enter the second qualifying round of the Europa Conference League. The second and third placed teams also enters the second qualifying round of the Europa Conference League. In the 2013–2014 season, Norway also had an additional place in the first qualifying round of the Europa League due to its fair play ranking.

The following data indicates Norwegian coefficient rankings between European football leagues.

Country ranking
UEFA association coefficients as of the end of the 2021–22 season, for league participation in the 2023–24 European football season (Previous year rank in italics):

 15.  (20)  Super League Greece (28.200)
 16.  (17)  Czech First League (27.800)
 17.  (22)  Eliteserien (27.250)
 18.  (14)  Danish Superliga (27.175)
 19.  (18)  Croatian First Football League (27.150)

Club ranking
UEFA 5-year Club Ranking as of 29 April 2022:
 88    Molde (19.000)
 94  Bodø/Glimt (17.000)
 106   Rosenborg (15.000)
 235. (new) Vålerenga (5.450)
 236.  Viking (5.450)

Attendance
From 1963 to 1971, the league consisted of ten teams (90 matches a year). Between 1972 and 1994, the league consisted of 12 teams (132 matches a year). The number was raised to 14 teams (182 matches a year) in 1995 and to 16 teams (240 matches a year) in 2009. Attendances reached peaks in 1963, 1968, 1977 and 2007, and were at their lowest in 1986.

The record for highest average home attendance for a club was set by Rosenborg in 2007 (19,903 over 13 home matches). 12 October 1985 saw the record for highest attendance at a match, with 28,569 in the game between Rosenborg and Lillestrøm at Lerkendal Stadion. The highest ever average attendance for Eliteserien as a whole was set in 2007 with 10,521.

 = Restricted due to Covid-19.

Players

Individual records

Most appearances

Most goals scored

Foreign players

Awards

Trophy
The winners of Eliteserien win two trophies. One small trophy in silver which they keep and one bigger trophy which are held only by reigning champions. The big trophy was introduced in 2012 and all winners from 2012 and onwards will get its club's name engraved on it. The ribbons that drape the handles are presented in the team colours of the league champions that year.

See also

Toppserien (Women's top division)
Norwegian football top scorers
List of football clubs in Norway
List of Eliteserien Champions from 1938 to present time

Notes and references

External links

Football Association of Norway
All-time Eliteserien table from 1963 to 2008
Tippeligaen Stats, Fixtures, Results and Team Profiles
Norway – List of Champions, RSSSF.com

 
1
Nor
Professional sports leagues in Norway
1937 establishments in Norway
Sports leagues established in 1937
Summer association football leagues